Dibutylboron trifluoromethanesulfonate (also called dibutylboron triflate or DBBT) is a reagent in organic chemistry. Its chemical formula is C9H18BF3O3S. It is used in asymmetric synthesis for example in the formation of boron enolates in the aldol reaction.

References

Organoboranes
Reagents for organic chemistry
Triflates
Butyl compounds